The Swiss Graduate School of Management is a private business school located in Bangalore, India. SGSM specializes within the field of international Business Administration offering MBA degrees as well as business courses.  It has an international network of partner schools and accreditation institutions.

External links

Educational institutions established in 2007
Business schools in Bangalore
2007 establishments in Karnataka